Nancy Farmer is an American author of children's and young adult books and science fiction. She has written three Newbery Honor Books and won the U.S. National Book Award for Young People's Literature for The House of the Scorpion, published by Atheneum Books for Young Readers in 2002.

Biography 

Farmer was born in Phoenix, Arizona. She earned her B.A. at Reed College (1963) and later studied chemistry and entomology at the University of California, Berkeley. She enlisted in the Peace Corps (1963–1965), and subsequently worked in Mozambique and Rhodesia (present-day Zimbabwe), where she studied biological methods of controlling the tsetse fly between 1975–1978.

She met her future husband, Harold Farmer, at the University of Rhodesia (now the University of Zimbabwe). They married after a week-long courtship. As of 2010, Farmer lives in Arizona's Chiricahua Mountains with her husband. They have one son, Daniel.

Bibliography

Novels

 Lorelei: The Story of a Bad Cat (Harare, Zimbabwe: College Press, 1987)
 The Eye, the Ear, and the Arm (College Press, 1989)
 Tapiwa's Uncle (College Press, 1993)
 Do You Know Me, illustrated by Shelley Jackson (Orchard Books, 1993)
 The Ear, the Eye and the Arm (Orchard, 1994)
 The Warm Place (Orchard, 1995)
 A Girl Named Disaster (Orchard, 1996)
 The House of the Scorpion (Atheneum Books, 2002)
 A New Year's Tale (2013) – paperback and e-book for adults
 The Lord of Opium (2013) – sequel to The House of the Scorpion

The Sea of Trolls trilogy
 The Sea of Trolls (Atheneum, 2004)
 The Land of the Silver Apples (Atheneum, 2007)
 The Islands of the Blessed (Atheneum, 2009)

Picture books
 Runnery Granary, illus. Jos. A. Smith (Greenwillow Books, 1996) – A Mystery Must Be Solved—Or the Grain is Lost!
 Casey Jones's Fireman: The Story of Sim Webb, illus. James Bernardin (New York: Phyllis Fogelman Books, 1999)
 Clever Ali, illus. Gail De Marcken (Orchard, 2006)

Short stories
 "The Mirror", L. Ron Hubbard Presents Writers of the Future, Volume IV (1988), pp. 35–65 – collection of twelve 1987 finalists; "The Mirror" won the grand prize
 "Tapiwa's Uncle", Cricket (February 1992)
 "Origami Mountain", The Year's Best Fantasy and Horror: Sixth Annual Collection (1992)
 "Falada: the Goose Girl's Horse", A Wolf At the Door, eds. Ellen Datlow and Terri Windling (2000)
 "Remember Me", Firebirds: An Anthology of Original Fantasy and Science Fiction, ed. Sharyn November (2003)
 "Bella's Birthday Present", Can You Keep a Secret, ed. Lois Metzger (2007)
 "The Mole Cure", Fantasy and Science Fiction (August 2007)
 "Ticket to Ride", Firebirds Soaring: An Anthology of Original Speculative Fiction, ed. Sharyn November (2008)
 "Castle Othello", Troll's Eye View, eds. Ellen Datlow and Terri Windling (2009)

Awards
"The Mirror" (1987)
 1988, Writers of the Future Grand Prize

The Ear, the Eye and the Arm (1994)
 1995 Newbery Honor Book (a Newbery Medal runner-up)
 1995, Hal Clement Award (Golden Duck Award, Young Adult)

A Girl Named Disaster (1996)
1996, National Book Award (U.S.) finalist, Young People's Literature
1997, Newbery Honor

The House of the Scorpion (2002)
2002, National Book Award for Young People's Literature
2003, Newbery Honor 
2003, Buxtehuder Bulle (Germany) 
2003, Printz Honor

The Land of the Silver Apples (2007)
 2007, Emperor Norton Award ("extraordinary invention and creativity unhindered by the constraints of paltry reason")

See also

References 

 Farmer. Nancy Farmer's official home page (nancyfarmerwebsite.com). 2008–present. Retrieved 2013-11-23.

External links
 
Excerpts from a Locus magazine interview with Nancy Farmer
 
 

1941 births
20th-century American novelists
20th-century American short story writers
20th-century American women writers
21st-century American novelists
21st-century American short story writers
21st-century American women writers
American children's writers
American fantasy writers
American science fiction writers
American women children's writers
American women novelists
American women short story writers
Living people
National Book Award for Young People's Literature winners
Newbery Honor winners
Novelists from Arizona
Reed College alumni
Women science fiction and fantasy writers
Writers of young adult science fiction